The music soundtrack of the Fallout series is composed of both licensed music from the mid-century's Jazz Age to the Space Age, as well as original scores by Mark Morgan, Matt Gruber, Devin Townsend, and Inon Zur. The series also features original songs and covers commissioned for the games as diegetic music heard in the world of Fallout.

Much of the licensed music used in the Fallout series includes popular hits recorded in the 1940s and 1950s in accordance with its atompunk retrofuturistic setting influenced by the post-war culture of 1950s United States in a post-apocalyptic version of the 21st, 22nd and 23rd centuries. However, with the introduction of 2010's Fallout: New Vegas, the Fallout series has also featured licensed recordings from each of nine consecutive decades from the 1920s to the 2000s.

Fallout

Original score

The original score for Fallout was composed by Mark Morgan as an ambient album and includes samples and remixes from other works. The score was released on CD by Interplay Productions in 1997. A selection of tracks was released to fans for free on May 10, 2010, as part of the Vault Archives album.

Licensed soundtrack
Fallout features an additional licensed song by the Ink Spots used in the game's introduction and end credits. The song was later reprised in the soundtracks for Fallout 3, Fallout 4, and Fallout 76.

Fallout 2

Original score

The original score for Fallout 2 was composed by Mark Morgan as an ambient album and includes samples and remixes from other works as well as previous tracks from Fallout. The score was released on CD by Interplay Productions in 1998. A selection of tracks was released to fans for free on May 10, 2010, as part of the Vault Archives album.

Licensed soundtrack
Fallout 2 features an additional licensed song by Louis Armstrong used in the game's introduction and end credits. The game also references more modern songs such as a poster prop, also found in the first game, featuring a cropped picture of Maynard James Keenan taken from the liner notes of the rock band Tool's debut 1993 album Undertow. Various non-player characters may quote lyrics from Elton John's 1972 song "Rocket Man", Tina Turner's 1985 song "We Don't Need Another Hero (Thunderdome)" (a reference to the film Mad Max Beyond Thunderdome which heavily inspired the Fallout series), or Sugar Ray's 1997 song "Fly".

Additional Fallout entries

Fallout Tactics: Brotherhood of Steel
The 2001 game Fallout Tactics: Brotherhood of Steel features 20 ambient tracks composed by Inon Zur. An official download was released by GOG.com upon purchasing the game. It is the only Fallout title to not feature a licensed 1950s-inspired track.

Fallout: Brotherhood of Steel
The 2004 game Fallout: Brotherhood of Steel features a number of 1950s-inspired background tracks by Matt Gruber (credited for "Additional Ambient Music") as well as more heavy metal inspired background tracks by Devin Townsend (credited for "Ambient and Battle Music"). The main menu theme, "A Nuclear Blast", was composed by Craig Stuart Garfinkle with sung lyrics as a pastiche of a 1950s nuclear-themed novelty song. An official score album has not been released.

In addition, the game features licensed tracks from modern day heavy metal bands mostly used as non-diegetic battle music.

Van Buren
Game development on the Van Buren project was cancelled in 2003 prior to release. In 2007, a short video of a tech demo created by Black Isle Studios in 2003 was hosted by No Mutants Allowed. The video features a cover of the 1931 song "Dream a Little Dream of Me" recorded by The Beautiful South in 1995.

A download of the tech demo included several ambient tracks from the 2001 compilation album Funeral Songs.

Fallout Online
Fallout Online is a cancelled massively multiplayer online game. Also known as Project V13, game development on the title was cancelled by 2012. In 2010, a teaser trailer was released on the now-defunct Fallout Online website featuring a song by Ma Rainey, "Slave to the Blues" recorded in 1925.

Fallout Shelter
A spin-off game of the Fallout series, Fallout Shelter was released just ahead of the announcement and release of 2015's Fallout 4. The game uses edited portions of the Fallout 3s Vault 101 PA system instrumental tracks as part of the background incidental music in the rooms and in the user-interface. It also uses a portion of "Pistol Packin' Mama" and the Nuka-World theme song featured in the Fallout 4 soundtrack.

Fallout 3
Original score

The original score for Fallout 3 was composed by Inon Zur as an orchestral album. The score was officially released on the iTunes digital store.

The Fallout 3 score was also released several times as a vinyl LP. In 2015 coinciding with the release of Fallout 4, a 14-track picture disc version of the Fallout 3 score was released through Hot Topic. It was reissued as a single LP in 2017 through ThinkGeek. In addition, record label Spacelab9 released a complete 29-track box set for the Fallout 3 score.
 In 2019, this was reissued as a 10th Anniversary Ultimate Edition which also included the licensed music LP Galaxy News Radio - Radio Selections from the Fallout 3 Soundtrack.

Licensed soundtrack
Fallout 3 also features a licensed soundtrack largely from the 40s and 50s which is broadcast as diegetic music on the in-game radio stations: Galaxy News Radio, Enclave Radio, and the Vault 101 PA System. According to the game's credits, the radio features songs from Decca (Geffen), Columbia (Brunswick), King (De Luxe), and RCA Victor Records. Several songs were licensed from Soundies Inc. which had digitized songs from transcription discs made available to the public for the first time. The Ink Spots song "Maybe" was reprised from the 1997 release of Fallout.

Portions of the licensed Fallout 3 soundtrack have been released on official compilation albums. A 5-song sampler CD of the licensed soundtrack and the score was given as a pre-order bonus for Fallout 3 at GameStop retailers. The CD was styled as a 45 rpm record from the game's radio station, Galaxy News Radio. In 2019, a 10-song sampler LP Galaxy News Radio - Radio Selections from the Fallout 3 Soundtrack was released by Spacelab9 with Googie-inspired cover art also styled after Galaxy News Radio; it was released as a standalone LP or bundled with the 10th Anniversary Fallout 3 score boxset. Three songs were not publicly issued on vinyl before. Due to licensing restrictions, the LP features the later 1947 version of Billie Holiday's "Easy Living" released under Decca Records with the Bob Haggart orchestra instead of the in-game 1937 version of Billie Holiday's "Easy Living" released under Brunswick Records with the Teddy Wilson orchestra.

Galaxy News Radio

Enclave Radio

The game features an additional radio station that plays fife and drum instrumental arrangements of American patriotic songs, most of which are in the public domain. The specific arrangements were licensed from Sound Ideas which issued the album Time Marches On - Military Marches, Ceremonial, Band Music SI-S1 in 1996 and under its subsidiary Westar Music as Proud & Spirited - Military/Marches WSR 171 in 2003.

Selections marked with † are public domain compositions arranged by Rick Rhodes and Danny Pelfrey. Selections marked with ‡ are public domain compositions arranged by Craig Riley (Sound Ideas) or Kelly Richmond (Westar Music). Selections marked with * are original compositions composed by Rick Rhodes and Danny Pelfrey and not derived from a pre-existing public domain patriotic song.

Vault 101 PA System

The game also features a radio station which is primarily accessible during the introductory level of the game. Among its announcements, it also plays instrumental jazz songs licensed from Sound Ideas which issued the album Frank's Place SI-N4 in 1995 and under its subsidiary Westar Music as Jazz - Effortless & Refined WSR 149 in 2003, composed by Jason Nyberg. The tracks have been retitled and reissued multiple times with different authorship credits between the CD and digital reissues under Sound Ideas and its subsidiaries and licensees. Some songs are more popularly known by their titles from a 2010 digital album, Jazz Band Serenades, retitled and re-authored by the Essential Jazz Masters, though the album was issued after the game's release in 2008.

Portions of the jazz instrumental tracks heard in Vault 101 were also used in the user-interface and background music of the 2015 vault-building simulator Fallout Shelter, a spin-off of the Fallout series. Additional tracks from the same album can be heard in Vault-Tec Radio from 2018's Fallout 76.

Original songs and covers
Certain songs may be optionally unlocked by completing an in-game task. Upon completion, a character named Agatha will perform select violin solos on her eponymously named Agatha's Station. According to the credits, the classical music violin performances were recorded for the game by Heather MacArthur.

Promotional only
Certain songs were used in promotional material, but were not used in the game itself. The Fallout 3 cinematic trailer presented at E3 2008 on July 15 featured the Bob Crosby song "Dear Hearts and Gentle People" which was omitted from the rest of the Bob Crosby songs used in the final game. "Dear Hearts and Gentle People" would later be included with the other Bob Crosby songs in 2015's Fallout 4 and 2018's Fallout 76.

Warner Chappell Production Music provided the opening track for the live-action portion of the trailer, "Picnic Prattle" composed by Cyril Watters. The rest of the E3 gameplay demonstration featured instrumental songs from Enclave Radio.

Fallout: New Vegas
Original score

The original score for Fallout: New Vegas was composed by Inon Zur as an orchestral album. The game also reprises several Mark Morgan score pieces from the Fallout 1 and 2 soundtracks as listed above. The score was officially released on the iTunes digital store.

Note: Tracks 36-39 are not part of the orchestral score composed by Inon Zur and function in the game as diegetic music. Due to licensing restrictions, the album omits an additional song "Cobwebs and Rainbows". They are covered more fully below.

Licensed soundtrack
Fallout: New Vegas also features a licensed soundtrack which is broadcast as diegetic music on the in-game radio stations. The songs cover the gamut from country-western and the 60s Rat Pack-era to more modern music recorded during the 1970s, 1980s, 1990s, and 2000s. According to the game's credits, the radio features songs from Columbia Records, Capitol Records, Decca Records (Geffen), Dominion Entertainment (K-tel), and RCA Victor Records. Several songs were licensed from Soundies Inc. which had digitized songs from transcription discs made available to the public for the first time. The game also features Bing Crosby's "Something's Gotta Give" then-recently digitized in 2009 from previously lost tapes. The game also uses a 1979 re-recording of "It's a Sin to Tell a Lie" making it the only Ink Spots song used in the Fallout series that is not the original version released on Decca Records.

Note: The in-game radio stations Radio New Vegas(♠), Mojave Music Radio(♦), and Black Mountain Radio(♣) have separate setlists and host commentary, but also share certain songs as so noted.N.B.:The end credits for the game also list "Hangover Heart" by Hank Thompson licensed from Soundies Inc.; the track was removed from the final version of the game.

Mysterious Broadcast

The game also features an additional radio station tied to the 2011 downloadable content Old World Blues. It features an original song "Begin Again" performed by the character Vera Keyes (see below for further details), as well as Peggy Lee's "Why Don't You Do Right?", Gerhard Trede's "Slow Bounce" and "Manhattan" reprised from the main game's radio station as well as several jazz instrumental tracks previously heard in the main game's casino lobbies.

Additional licensed tracks

Additional classical music songs may play on completion of certain in-game quests or in the casino lobbies including Johann Sebastian Bach's Concerto for Two Violins - Largo ma non tanto, Léo Delibes' Flower Duet, Felix Mendelssohn's "Spring Song", Wolfgang Amadeus Mozart's Piano Concerto No. 21 - Andante, Antonio Vivaldi's Concerto No. 10 -  1 and 3 Allegro, The Four Seasons - "Winter"- Largo, and Richard Wagner's "Ride of the Valkyries".

Original songs and covers
Certain songs may be optionally unlocked by completing an in-game task. The player may recruit the singer characters Bruce Isaac and The Lonesome Drifter to perform at one of the casinos. The Lonesome Drifter sings music based on traditional folk songs with lyrics modified to have in-universe references. Bruce Isaac sings a cover of the 1993 song "Cobwebs and Rainbows" by Dick Walter with lyrics modified to have in-universe references. It is notably the first original cover of a pre-existing modern song used in the Fallout series. The singing voice for all of the original song covers and the modified song lyrics were provided by developer Josh Sawyer with instrumental accompaniment by other game developers, except for "Cobwebs and Rainbows" which uses a pre-existing instrumental written by composer Dick Walter.

The 2010 downloadable content Dead Money features two musician characters, Dean Domino and Vera Keyes. Dean Domino can perform the song "Saw Her Yesterday", a retitled and unedited clip of Bing Crosby's "Something's Gotta Give", previously featured on the main game's radio station. Additional song titles are mentioned, but are unplayable. Vera Keyes sings an original composition, "Begin Again", which serves as the "theme song" of the downloadable content. The song was produced by various members of the Obsidian developer staff: Vera Keyes is voiced by art intern Stephanie Dowling (née Stephanie DeBrule, original credit) with music by Justin Bell, sound designer. Chris Avellone, creative lead, and Mikey Dowling, audio producer, wrote the lyrics.

The song "Begin Again" was featured again on the Mysterious Broadcast radio tied to the 2011 downloadable content Old World Blues. The Bethesda blog released an official download in 2011 followed by official sheet music for the song in 2012.

Four of the five original song recordings, with the exception of "Cobwebs and Rainbows", were provided on the official iTunes digital release of the Fallout: New Vegas score.

Promotional only
Certain songs were used in promotional material, but were not used in the game itself. The 1950 song "Orange Colored Sky" by Nat King Cole was featured in a television commercial promoting Fallout: New Vegas in 2010. The song was not included in the final game, but would be featured in 2015's Fallout 4 and 2018's Fallout 76.

Fallout 4
Original score

The original score for Fallout 4 was composed by Inon Zur as an orchestral album.  The score was officially released on the iTunes digital store.

The Fallout 4 score was also released several times as a vinyl LP. In 2016, a 8-track picture disc version of the Fallout 4 score was released through GameStop and ThinkGeek. In addition, record label Spacelab9 released a complete 65-track box set for the Fallout 4 score.

An additional digital EP was officially released on iTunes in 2015 featuring the original covers sung by Lynda Carter in the game, covered more fully below.

Licensed soundtrack
Fallout 4 also features a licensed soundtrack which is broadcast as diegetic music on the in-game radio stations. According to the game's credits, the radio features songs from Decca (Geffen), Columbia (Brunswick), King (De Luxe), Capitol, Dot, Sun, Laurie and RCA Victor Records. Comparing the credits from the previous games, several songs previously licensed from Soundies Inc., which had digitized songs from transcription discs to make them available to the public for the first time, are now licensed from The Orchard following the dissolution of Soundies Inc.

The licensed soundtrack reprises nearly all the songs featured on Fallout 3s main radio station with the exception of the songs credited to APM Music. It additionally features the songs "Dear Hearts and Gentle People" and "Orange Colored Sky", previously only used in promotional material for previous Fallout games. Part 2 of "Butcher Pete" was also newly added along with the pre-existing Part 1. A number of atomic and nuclear themed novelty songs were added to the soundtrack when audio director Mark Lampert was shown and become interested in "a pocket of music that [he] hadn't heard before" and as a 1950s commentary of "there's almost a naiveté to the lyrics in these songs – as if these were children playing with something [atomic weapons] they didn't understand."

Lynda Carter also provides original songs for the character Magnolia which can be optionally unlocked and added to the game's main radio station, Diamond City Radio. In total in addition to 5 songs from Magnolia, 25 songs are new to the Fallout series radio with 12 songs being reprised.

Diamond City Radio

Note: Tracks which have been reprised from 2008's Fallout 3 are marked with ▲. Please refer to the Fallout 3 section for their annotations. Tracks which were previously used only in promotional material are marked with ⁋.N.B.: Five additional songs by the character Magnolia can be optionally unlocked and added to the radio by performing an in-game task. They are covered more fully below.

Radio Freedom

The Radio Freedom station features a total of 11 songs played on the fiddle or violin in the style of United States colonial era music. The titles and the performer(s) are not known.

Settlement Recruitment Beacon

The player can build an optional radio station antenna which broadcasts the same music used in Enclave Radio in Fallout 3.

Classical Radio

The Classical Radio station features around 30 instrumental pieces of classical music by various composers.

Original songs and covers

Certain songs may be optionally unlocked by completing an in-game task. Upon completion the character Magnolia can have her songs added to the Diamond City Radio setlist. Actress and singer Lynda Carter provided the voice for Magnolia in addition to writing the songs along with songwriter John Barlow Jarvis and guitarist Kerry Marx. Session players from Nashville included director/drummer Paul Leim and horn player "Blue Lou" Marini. The 5 songs were officially released as a digital EP on the iTunes digital store.

Raider Radio

The game also features an additional radio station tied to the 2016 downloadable content Nuka-World. It features original songs performed by the character RedEye who also hosts the radio station. Musician Andrew W.K. wrote and performed the songs in addition to voicing the character. He described working on character as, "When I pictured RedEye, I kind of imagined myself being more filthy and ravaged than ever - like I would be after not sleeping for two months and drinking nothing but radioactive cola. That's actually pretty close to how I actually felt during the voiceover recording sessions for the game. I was drinking super intense custom energy drinks and I hadn't slept in days. I think it worked great as a method for getting into character - I was totally fried and sizzling!"

The Nuka World downloadable content also features the titular theme song and jingle which plays over the theme park's loudspeaker systems on repeat. It was produced by COPILOT Music and Sound and officially released as a digital single on the iTunes digital store.

Promotional only
Certain songs were used in promotional material, but were not used in the game itself. During E3 2016, the promotional trailer for the downloadable content the Contraptions Workshop featured Raymond Scott's "Powerhouse" instrumental.

The promotional trailer for the virtual reality version of Fallout 4 (Fallout 4 VR) shown at E3 2017 featured "Mr. Sandman". The song would later be used in 2018's Fallout 76.

Fallout 76

Original score

The original score for Fallout 76 was composed by Inon Zur as an orchestral album. The score was officially released on the Apple Music digital store.

Portions of Fallout 76 score were also released as a vinyl record and CD. In 2018, French retailer Micromania offered a pre-order bonus 10-track LP featuring 5 songs from the Fallout 76 score and 5 songs from the Fallout 4 score.  A 5-track sampler CD was also offered at various game retailers.

Two additional singles of the covers of "Take Me Home, Country Roads" and "Ring of Fire" by Spank were also officially released on Apple Music, covered more fully below.

Another score installment was added with the early 2020 downloadable content Wastelanders. The score was officially released on the Apple Music digital store.

An additional score installment was added for the late 2020 downloadable content Steel Dawn. The score was officially released on the Apple Music digital store.

Licensed soundtrack
Fallout 76 also features a licensed soundtrack which is broadcast as diegetic music on the in-game radio stations. Many songs are themed towards the game's setting in Appalachia with country and bluegrass songs as well as songs relating to the coal mining industry. According to the game's credits, the radio features songs from Decca (Geffen), Columbia, King (De Luxe), Capitol, Dot, MGM, Cadence, and RCA Victor Records. Comparing the credits from the previous games, only "Dear Hearts and Gentle People" was licensed from Soundies Inc., which had prior to going defunct had digitized songs from transcription discs to make them available to the public for the first time, and is co-credited in the credits with The Orchard. An additional song, "Headin' Down the Wrong Highway" was taken from the same 2000 album of Johnny Bond songs also used for Fallout: New Vegas. The song is credited as licensed from Bloodshot Records which had formerly partnered with Soundies Inc. to preserve music from transcription discs.

In addition to the customary songs from the 40s and 50s, the game features many more songs from the 1930s as well as including songs from the 1960s. For the main station, Appalachia Radio, 36 songs are new to the Fallout series. 11 songs were reprised from previous games (6 originally from the radio of Fallout 3, 5 from the radio of Fallout 4). Two additional covers of "Take Me Home, Country Roads" and "Ring of Fire" were added to the radio in subsequent updates, covered more fully below.

Appalachia Radio

Note: Tracks which were originally reprised from 2008's Fallout 3 are marked with ▲. Tracks which have been newly reprised from 2015's Fallout 4 are marked with a ■. Please refer to the Fallout 3 and Fallout 4 sections for their respective annotations. Tracks which were previously used only in promotional material are marked with ⁋.

N.B.: The two covers of "Take Me Home, Country Roads" and "Ring of Fire" by doo-wop group Spank were added to Appalachia Radio in subsequent updates. They are covered more fully below. Five songs were present in the early public beta test of the game: Bing Crosby's "Swinging on a Star", Sons of the Pioneers' "Tumbling Tumbleweeds", Cab Calloway's "Jumpin' Jive", Jerry Irby's "Great Long Pistol", and Emmett Miller's "That's the Good Old Sunny South". The reason for their removal and the exact versions previously used are not known as this time.

Classical Radio

Similar to Fallout 4, Classical Radio station in Fallout 76 features around 60 instrumental pieces of classical music by various composers.

Vault-Tec Radio

The game also features a radio station which is primarily accessible during the introductory level of the game. It plays many of the same jazz instrumental tracks heard in Fallout 3's Vault 101 PA System with the exception of the track called Be-Bop Shop/Music to Burn/Jump for Joy. Two of the tracks are alternative mixes of the Fallout 3 versions present on the original 1995 Sound Ideas album composed by Jason Nyberg, but emphasize different instruments. It also features three additional tracks from the same album: A Night in Topeka/Sweet Cicely/You've Stolen My Heart, Someday/Straight and Narrow, and Dinner for Two/Wallflower/Last Dance of the Night. Several of the alternative mixes were re-released as a digital album using the Westar titles and reattributed to the Dinner Music Ensemble for the 2015 album Date Night.

Additional licensed tracks

In 2019, APM Music released a statement revealing it had provided "100+ cues licensed for Fallout 76". APM Music also released an official digital album in 2018 featuring 39 tracks licensed for the game. Several tracks serve as background music for the game's item store, the Atomic Shop, with seasonal Halloween and Christmas song variants. Others play during gameplay such as on the game's jukeboxes, gramophones, and specific quests including "Jazz Potatoes" from the Wasted on Nukashine quest and "One More Pils" for a quest based on Fastnacht.

Original songs and covers
Two original covers of the songs "Ring of Fire" and "Take Me Home, Country Roads" were recorded by New York-based doo wop group Spank, produced by COPILOT Music and Sound, and arranged by Ravi Krishnaswami. "Country Roads" was introduced in the debut trailer for Fallout 76 in 2018 while "Ring of Fire" was introduced in the trailer for the 2019 downloadable content Nuclear Winter. The cover of the 1971 song "Country Roads" is the second original cover of a pre-existing modern song used in the Fallout series, the first being the cover of the 1993 song "Cobwebs and Rainbows" from Fallout: New Vegas.

In a 2019 interview, Spank group member Scout Ford noted that getting the opportunity to record the songs was a happy coincidence from performing at a child's birthday party to the parents putting them in contact with the Fallout 76 producers. Specifically, they wanted a certain musical tone and "We did it according to what the client wanted, but we were able to layer the harmonies with our own sound".

Initially used in the promotional trailers for the game, both songs were added to the in-game radio and officially released on the Apple Music digital store. In 2018, Bethesda announced all proceeds from the digital sales of "Country Roads" were being donated to Habitat for Humanity, assuring a minimum  donation. The cover of "Take Me Home, Country Roads" also saw a physical release as a vinyl 45 record given as a promotional item with the December 2018 issue of Stack magazine from Australian retailer JB Hi-Fi.

Promotional only
Certain songs were used in promotional material, but were not used in the game itself. During E3 2018, a shorter variation of the "Let's Work With Others" trailer for Fallout 76 featured Ray Smith's song "Right Behind You Baby", previously used in Fallout 4, but not in Fallout 76. The promotional trailer for the early 2020 downloadable content Wastelanders featured Eddie Cochran's "C'mon Everybody". The 2020 Summer Update trailer for The Legendary Run season featured the song "The More I Get, The More I Want" by the contemporary Swedish-Danish band, The Kokomo Kings.

The trailer for the late 2020 downloadable content Steel Dawn featured the Outlaws' cover of the song "(Ghost) Riders in the Sky: A Cowboy Legend" taken from their 1980 album Ghost Riders. Fallout 76 had previously featured the 1959 Sons of the Pioneers version of the song. The 2020 Year in Review trailer featured the rockabilly song "Keep on Rollin" by Terry Devine-King.

Critical reception and analysis
The soundtrack of the Fallout series has also attracted commentary and analysis in the popular press and in academic lumusicological study particularly of the licensed music presented as diegetic music within the game world.

Ambient score
French author Rémi Lopez complimented Mark Morgan's ambient score for 1997's Fallout as a "sensory experience...one moment desolate, the next wild." The tracks varied from droning, dark ambient ("Radiation Storm", "Underground Troubles") to tribal percussion  ("Moribund World", "City of Lost Angels") to contrast the choice between "the remains of a dead civilization and a return to primal brutality." However, Lopez noted that Morgan was accused of plagiarism due to similarities of his tracks with ambient musician Aphex Twin due to having been given a reference music CD containing Aphex Twin's work by video game producer Tim Cain though Cain "deliberately omitt[ed] the names of the artists".

Likewise for 1998's Fallout 2, Lopez noted that the game expanded the pre-existing soundtrack from the predecessor by adding a dozen more tracks with Morgan adding electric guitar in "My Chrysalis Highwayman" and electronic sounds in "All-Clear Signal". As an Easter egg to fans of the series, Lopez noted that Obsidian and Bethesda licensed the ambient tracks from the first two Fallout games in 2010's Fallout: New Vegas "as if in homage to Mark Morgan's previous work."

Inon Zur's orchestral score for 2008's Fallout 3 was nominated for a BAFTA Games Award for Best Original Score at the 2009 5th British Academy Games Awards as well as nominated for Best Original Score at the 2008 Spike Video Game Awards. Similarly, Inon Zur's score for 2015's Fallout 4 was nominated for a BAFTA Games Award for Best Music at the 2016 12th British Academy Games Awards as well as nominated for Best Score/Soundtrack at The Game Awards 2015.

Author William Cheng noted Inon Zur's score for 2008's Fallout 3 as an "unintrusive, sparsely textured soundtrack" garnering "much acclaim".

Fallout 76 was nominated for a Tin Pan Alley Award for Best Music in a Game at the New York Game Awards.

Licensed music as diegetic music
Ivănescu noted that while 1997's Fallout and 1998's Fallout 2 only featured "one appropriated song each", the two songs, the Ink Spots' "Maybe" and Louis Armstrong's "A Kiss to Build a Dream On" start playing before any gameplay imagery begins and are "the first introduction to the world depicted in the games." This connection of imagery and music has continued into the later rebooted entries in the Fallout series where the music and "popular culture of the past" is repurposed into postmodern works while also bringing to mind literary modernist traditions including the 1981 short story "The Gernsback Continuum" and the 1922 poem "The Waste Land". In both, the reader is invited to explore the future while documenting vignettes of the past.

In the chapter "A Tune at the End of the World" in his 2014 book, Cheng recognized that despite the critically acclaimed score by Inon Zur for 2008's Fallout 3, much of the attention of player and critics was directed towards the music from the three diegetic radio stations of the game: Enclave Radio, Galaxy News Radio, and Agatha's Station. Cheng describes the player character growing up in an underground vault throughout childhood until a sudden incident forces the player to leave and escape into the nuclear wasteland on the surface such that "the first time in your life, it seems, you're alone" He notes the dual nature of music being a warm companion or an unfeeling entity in Fallout 3. The player is notified by their "Pip-Boy" device seconds later of the availability of a new radio broadcast signal offering "noisy relief from the silence and solitude of the Capital Wasteland. Music and voices from the radio bestow a sense of imagined community by promising that somewhere, someone else is listening to the same thing." However, the "promise" turns to illusion as the player realizes every station runs on a loop featuring music from a distant past and most NPC's "never acknowledge (much less sing along to) these canned broadcasts." The charismatic chats by President Eden on Enclave Radio are merely the work of an artificial "self-aware supercomputer". Galaxy News Radio has "spirited monologues sound spontaneous and plausibly live, but since the player is able to hear Three Dog on the radio while watching him mill around the station (not performing on air), it can be inferred that his speeches are recorded." Agatha's Station features violin improvisation with the eponymous character looking "to be the only person creating new music in this artistically bankrupt world." A request for a "live performance" is "a real treat",  "a rare simulation of live musicality in the game" at first. Author William Gibbons in his 2018 book wrote that Agatha's live music "embodies art's tenacity even in the most adverse of circumstances" giving proof that civilization, humanity, and hope survives in the wasteland compared to the "'dead' records we hear on other radio stations". However, repeat performances reveal herself to be an automaton where "the motions of her fingers and bow don't line up with the music" and "like any NPC, inevitably loses her magic luster, baring the gears that turn like clockwork beneath her painted skin." Gibbons concurs that her "liveness" requires a "suspension of disbelief on our part." Like the wasteland itself, the radio provides hints of life, but also emptiness.

In 2010's Fallout: New Vegas, Ivănescu comments that Mojave Music Radio and Radio New Vegas are not "as integrated in the narrative" as in Fallout 3. She notes that of the two, only Radio New Vegas features a host, Mr. New Vegas, a combination of the suave news delivery of Three Dog and the artificial intelligence of President Eden from the previous game. Mojave Music Radio has no talking DJ described by Ivănescu as "reflecting the more rural myth of the Wild West, often centered around natural, rather than man-made beauty, and the freedom of an uninhabited landscape."

Ivănescu notes that the radio stations of 2015's Fallout 4 continue to maintain the "picture of an everlasting America or at least an everlasting American Dream" of previous games in Diamond City Radio, Classical Radio, and Radio Freedom. Gibbons contrasts the classical music of Agatha's Station in 2008's Fallout 3 with Fallout 4's Classical Radio. While available at the beginning of the game (as opposed to the quest required to access Agatha's Station), Gibbons notes that further gameplay reveals is "a tool of The Institute, an 'enlightened' and scientifically advanced organization" who views most other people living in the wasteland as "savages". Here it, it both converges and diverges from the intent in Fallout 3; they are both "a 'civilizing' force", but Agatha's music is a "benevolent influence" while The Institute is a "patriarchal and arguably nefarious" influence. Ivănescu regards Radio Freedom as the most novel, playing instrumental violin songs that imply "[honesty], hope and a carefree existence" in-line with the colonial America-esque Minutemen faction that run the station. Ivănescu also compliments the use of the five original songs performed by actress Lynda Carter as the character Magnolia. The songs serve double duty in terms of intra-diegetic gameplay where the descriptive lyrics both "allude to places and events in the gameworld" and also "feature sultry, firtatious tones" as an indicator that the character can engage in a romantic relationship with the player.

Cheng explored two examples of the diegetic music affecting the gameplay experience in 2008's Fallout 3 both within the game and to the player at the game's controls, or diegesis. The first centers on a quest regarding the option of blowing up the city of Megaton with a nuclear bomb. The author noted his first repeated playthroughs of the game in 2010 and 2011 involved disarming the bomb instead, being given a modest reward by the residents of the city, and igniting the wrath of the city's antagonist. A subsequent playthrough in 2012 explored the other option meeting the city's antagonizers, characters named Mr. Burke and Alistair Tenpenny. At this time, Cheng notes he was using a video game recording software to capture the gameplay as he planned to show the footage at future presentations regarding his paper. He comments on how the physical action of the player pressing a button on a controller is directly reflected with pressing the remote detonator in the game to a point where this "mimetic link" was "almost too close for comfort."  The brilliant light of the mushroom cloud, the silence of the delayed sonic reaction suddenly combined with the music of Enclave Radio playing "The Stars and Stripes Forever" where the "piece invokes the American nation in all its cultural and military pride." However standing before the "Big Red Button", Cheng noted it drew his attention to "Mr. Tenpenny's embodiment of the Enclave's radical authority and extremist ideologies." Following the utter destruction of the distant city, Enclave Radio played "America the Beautiful" which made it "made it all the more tasteless" as if "rubbing the noses of the departed in Mr. Tenpenny's triumph." Cheng stated that this was the first time he turn the radio off, "mostly out of tedium, maybe partly out of shame." Reviewing the recorded footage, Cheng remarked how he had pressed the button almost in sync with the closing of the march whether as a coincidence or "preemptively obliged to put on a show for the eventual lecture audiences". Whether theatrical or not, Cheng also notes it was the obedient thing to do where he had hesitated to press the button, but was compelled by the march as well as the gameplay. He wondered if he had been more or less likely to continue with the act if the radio was playing classical music or if it was turned off. Cheng cites other examples of "blame displacement" in historical situations in addition to quotes from other players posted in online forums about this ethical dilemma taken from a moral standpoint vs. a pragmatic standpoint even as a simulated scenario. In a footnote, Cheng gives an anecdote of presenting the Megaton gameplay at the Harvard Department of Music in 2011. After asking for volunteers from the assembled professors and graduate students to push the "Big Red Button", half the people in the room hesitantly raised their hands. The volunteer picked at random to set off the fictional bomb said she felt "strangely guilty" in front of her peers and professors "even though the people [the Megaton residents] weren't real!"

Cheng's second example featured a lighter gameplay instance. Though access to Enclave Radio and Galaxy New Radio was readily available at the beginning of the game, Cheng notes he had to complete a specific quest of retrieving and giving a violin to gain access to the private radio signal about Agatha's Station "about eight hours into the game." Once again, he was using a video game recording software to create clips of the station's contents for future presentations. After exiting Agatha's house, he noted that Prelude of Bach's Violin Partita No. 2 was playing on the newly acquired radio signal as he climbed a nearby hill intending to complete other tasks in the game. However, the author stopped on the hill as the station played Bach, violin improvisations, and Dvořák as the surrounding sky grew brighter. "It eventually dawned on me that I was witnessing sunrise." Cheng realized that while listening to the radio he was "not playing the game in a conventional sense", leaving the game controls untouched for a half-hour. In contrast to the music at Megaton, Cheng remarked that the music here had served as a method of disobedience to ignore the gameplay where he had "subtly transgressed against the game itself, dismissing its call to arms one track at a time." He later noted that he was possibly influenced again by the recording software, this time acting as "if I were at a live recital of classical music in the real world." His recording would be watched by others and he would play the part of the "conscientious listener" and "on my best behavior." Cheng's chapter also includes tables for Enclave Radio, Galaxy News Radio, and Agatha's Station, listing composers, performers, and recording/composition dates as well as note transcriptions of Agatha's violin improvisations.

Content, control, and limited availability of music
Regarding the musical content of the radio stations in Fallout 3, Cheng loosely summarizes them as "the 1940s (GNR), 1890s (the Enclave's Sousa), or 1720s (Agatha's Bach). Galaxy News Radio features songs from the Great American Songbook tackling "first-world (that is, preapocalyptic) problems" written and sung by people "who could hardly have imagined what it would be like one day to live in a world truly on fire." However the prevalence of "American songs, marches, and anthems on GNR and Enclave Radio" can lead to the impression that "hyperviolence in the wasteland is somehow endemic to everyday American society" or what is now the future remnants of American society. Agatha's station is a prominent exception to the litany of American-written compositions. The classical music of Johann Sebastian Bach, Antonín Dvořák, and Pablo de Sarasate are "ghettoized (relegated to the margins of the airwaves)" and is entirely dependent on the player retrieving a Stradivarius violin to give to Agatha. Cheng notes that this private signal can only be detected on the player's Pip-Boy and not on any other available radio set. This so-called pirate underground radio station of music praised in the present-day "for its alleged universal appeal—provides a fittingly ironic reflection of the wasteland's cultural upheavals."

Cheng notes there are "conspicuous double entendres when heard in the game's postapocalyptic setting" and details lines and lyrics from "I Don't Want to Set the World on Fire", "Civilization", and "Butcher Pete" in 2008's Fallout 3. Though Ivănescu notes several songs later included in 2015's Fallout 4 ranged from "ambivalent feelings towards nuclear power" to genuine "tension, propaganda and fear associated with [the Cold War]". Songs like "Atom Bomb Baby", "Uranium Fever", and "Uranium Rock" were regarded as whimsical "novelty songs" at the time, but also are loaded with the period's "pervasive anxieties".

Regarding Galaxy News Radio, Ivănescu notes that "Civilization" functions as a commentary on "xenophobia and racism" as well as a "critique of a civilisation" as a product of the Atomic Age. Other songs like "'Way Back Home", "I'm Tickled Pink", "Happy Times", and "Let's Go Sunning" present optimism and "present America through rose tinted glasses, drawing a picture of the American Dream, the American way of life and all-American values." "A Wonderful Guy" in addition carries implications of an anti-racist message, brought through the musical vehicle of the originating 1949 play South Pacific.

In 2010's Fallout: New Vegas Ivănescu summarizes the Mojave Music Radio and Radio New Vegas stations as respectively providing the cowboys and the crooners that "invoke both freedom and violence, both unlimited possibilities and corruption and crime." Instead of visions of Middle America and white picket fences, the soundtracks of a post-apocalyptic version of Las Vegas "represent yet another facet of the American Dream: the one associated with explorers, pioneers and making your fortune." The surrounding empty wasteland is represented through the lyrics of "Stars of the Midnight Range" while the glamour of the desert city of New Vegas and its casinos is conveyed through Rat Pack veterans Frank Sinatra's "Blue Moon" and Dean Martin's "Ain't That a Kick in the Head". Along with Nat King Cole's "Love Me As Though There Were No Tomorrow", all three songs evoke love, capitalism, and sexual promiscuity from Sin City though Martin's song also echoes the violence of passion and the literal kick/gunshot in the head suffered by the player character at the beginning of the game.  Ivănescu notes that four songs play across all of the main radio stations in Fallout: New Vegas: "Johnny Guitar", "It's a Sin to Tell a Lie", "Heartaches by the Number", and "Big Iron". All four "present warnings and moral judgement" singing about people who "find their comeuppance" in the country, film noir, and femme fatale genres. "Big Iron" features an explicit example of tracking down a criminal while "Why Don't You Do Right?" serves as a reflection of the player's action on the game world. "Johnny Guitar" rounds off the setlist, bridging the gap between the two worlds invoking the "glamour of a casino as much as a saloon" from its title western and Peggy Lee's sultry voice. Lopez noted that the same themes extended to the present day with more modern country and jazz songs "dated from 1990 to 2000" including "Let's Ride into the Sunset Together", "Lone Star", "Slow Sax", and "Sit and Dream". With modern musicians tackling age-old themes in a contemporary fashion, the "illusion was seamless" among the older songs on the Fallout: New Vegas soundtrack.

Cheng also notes that similar games have featured diegetic licensed music before such as the BioShock series and the Grand Theft Auto series, in Fallout 3 the player wields exceptional control "over the very existence of radio music in the wasteland." Aside from the prosaic action of merely turning the radio on and off, killing President Eden will shut off the patriotic music of Enclave Radio, failing to repair a relay dish causes Galaxy News Radio's swing music to remain weak and static-filled, and refusing to retrieve a violin for Agatha will never activate her radio signal of classical music. Ivănescu singles out Agatha's violin as serving a rare triple duty not as mere nostalgia, but also of historical significance (it is the Stradivarius once owned by Amédée Soil in 1714), as personal significance (as Agatha's possession), and as musical significance (to create living music). Ivănescu summarizes that these scant remnants of "[cultural] currency becomes literal currency" including in the form of lost music like the games' iconic, ersatz bottlecap currency to buy and sell the American Dream in its new, altered forms. The player "determines what music survives and what passes into extinction."

Setting aside the player agency regarding personal control over the airwaves' content, Cheng offers diegetic and non-diegetic explanations for the seemingly limited setlists of the radio stations in Fallout 3. Players may ask why "there's no trace of music composed (at the very least) between 1950 and 2077" and whether it flourished or failed to be preserved. For the diegetic explanations for "the wasteland's dearth of new music", Cheng says Agatha pre-records her music "because it would be too tiring for her to play live day and night" and also says of Three Dog of Galaxy News Radio that he "hasn't managed to scavenge more than a few music records in playable condition." Gibbons also says that the Fallout games "[suggest] that the atomic blasts destroyed all post-vinyl recording technology, but that tortured logic seems both unconvincing and unnecessary." Cheng segues into the non-diegetic explanations as "[excuses] like these permitted the game's creators to circumvent questions about what directions music would take in the years leading up to 2277." There is a lack of new music in the Capital Wasteland (aside from Agatha's) both because it is "unimaginable for the gameworld's traumatized inhabitants" and also unimaginable to the present player "what music hundreds of years from now will sound like". Ostensibly, the primary reason for the song selection from decades ago is "reduced licensing costs" though using songs by "more recent artists (say, Golijov or Gaga) [a modern classical music composer and a modern pop singer] would have had greater difficulty establishing the vague sense of pastness" while this "hodgepodge of pre-1950s tunes could sound sufficiently old" by modern players of the game.

In a 2019 video essay for Polygon, Brian David Gilbert criticized that the songs in Fallout were old and lacked new music, citing the songs "Anything Goes" (1930s), "I Don't Want to Set the World on Fire"/"Jingle Jangle Jingle" (1940s), and "Big Iron"/"Johnny Guitar" (1950s). He also criticized the 185 years from 2102 to 2287 in Fallout, saying only two people, Magnolia and Red Eye, were still recording new music.

As a coda to the seemingly limited selection of music, Ivănescu remarks how the aura of Elvis Presley's "semiotic ghost" survives in 2010's Fallout: New Vegas, but not his name nor his music. A former Elvis impersonation school serves as the headquarters of a gang called "The Kings". With only the word "School" remaining visible on the building's façade, the gang members suppose it as a religious institution dedicated to the worship of this unnamed figure and strive to uphold and imitate the lost traditions, albeit in an entirely misinformed manner. Ivănescu recognizes it as an overall "comment on fandom" where ghosts can linger, legacy is forgotten, and a pseudo-religion can emerge with even with few known details of its origin. The limited or non-existent nature of the music of Elvis has helped to create an alternate "ahistorical world" where "all that remains is a shadow" of the original context. Meanwhile, Lopez notes the non-diegetic explanation that "Bethesda fought hard to secure the rights to his [Elvis Presley's] music", but the licensing costs for "a single song from the King" did not outweigh the benefits of "a wide variety of tracks".

Co-opted or false nostalgia, repurposing, and revived interest of music
Andra Ivănescu, in the opening chapter of her 2019 book, clarifies the difference between using the terms pre-existing vs. borrowed vs. appropriated music in video games. Though the terms may appear interchangeable, they provide different connotations. "Pre-existing music" is imprecise and "does not suggest anything about how the music is used" aside from it having existed before. "Borrowed music" suggests an "innocuous" relationship between the old and new uses though remains unchanged and not a transformative use. "Appropriated music" is the most "charged" term evoking cultural appropriation where "dominant cultures take and use elements of minority cultures for profit and without context". However, Ivănescu recommends using the term "appropriated" over the more neutral term "borrowed" as the latter addresses transformative uses and "deliberate artistic recontextualisation". Namely "appropriated music" more readily conveys usage with "whole or with little modification", it remains "recognisable", and "recontextualised". Borrowed music can be easily returned, but appropriated music "begs for a reason, a motivation, an explanation" despite the negative connotations as well as connecting to the historical use of "deliberate artistic appropriation" and "the entire spectrum of its sociocultural significance in mind."

Cheng notes that "most players are not likely to know the exact date (or even decade) of particular pieces" or perhaps have a hazy, "obscure, daresay conflated, past—remembrance without precise referent." Ivănescu brings up that it is temping to categorize the radio stations of Fallout 3 "as simply the heroes (GNR) and the villains (Enclave Radio)", but their musical content and broadcast propaganda speaks to their "more profound similarity" regarding "paramusical echoes of racism". Three Dog of Galaxy News Radio gives speeches against "bigots" and "ghouls", humans who have been drastically mutated through radiation. Enclave Radio serves as propaganda to accomplish their goal to remove irradiated "impure" humans from the wasteland. Aside from providing access through reminiscences with friends and relatives who did live during that period of music, Cheng brings up that many of the songs are "double-edged" with most players unaware of the context or history. Galaxy News Radio may be remembered from "old-timey films, television parodies, theme parties, and grandparents' dusty records" and "cheery, sassy nonchalance", but also for the "brutal wartime climates out of which this repertoire emerged." Enclave Radio brings up the "legacies of American pomp and pride" and "American nationalism", but also the "shadows of imperialism and xenophobia." Agatha's Station and her classical music performance is associated with "antiquity...with roots reaching back centuries", but also "freighted with potential connotations of elitism, exoticism." Overall, even the transmission through the medium of radio has the potential to bring up "endless debates about consumerism, commercialism, and propaganda." Though Cheng says exactly "[how] much any player recognizes or cares about these possibilities for critique remains a different question." Ivănescu quotes from author Svetlana Boym's critique of nostalgia where as "[survivors] of the twentieth century, we are all nostalgic for a time when we were not nostalgic" where the mythical future of Fallout is constructed out of the equally mythical past. Cheng draws parallels to the player at the controls with the game's NPCs where the "tunes ostensibly evoke no more than a blurry sense of a distant past."

However, Cheng also brings up how the music has brought back a revived interest to a new generation. Players "upon completing their adventure...encounter big band tunes, American hymns, or Baroque preludes in everyday life (at concerts, on YouTube, in coffee shops) are liable to yearn for the game itself". Cheng also gives examples of quotes taken from internet forums of players turning on the radio to "beat the wasteland's lonely, perilous ambience", demonstrate "swagger and sass", or simply revel in the random chance of music pairings with the action of gameplay images with players "mashing together cheerful songs and terrible conflict" to become "subversive Kubrickian visionaries". Ivănescu compares the "cheery sounds" of "Jingle Jangle Jingle" and the player committing "unspeakable atrocities" in Fallout: New Vegas to the use of "Stuck in the Middle with You" in the torture scene from Quentin Tarantino's 1992 film Reservoir Dogs. Cheng focuses on a quote from a player's post on a forum that there is "'nothing wrong' with listening to soothing oldies while simulating gruesome actions [a long distance sniper shot]". Cheng notes that such a comment under normal circumstances would be absolutely horrific, bringing to mind the actions of Nazi doctor Josef Mengele who would whistle snippets of classical music by Mozart, Wagner, Verdi, Puccini, and Johann Strauss, "making music while selecting victims for the gas chambers". He cites Joseph Moreno regarding Mengele's actions on the question :"How could genuine musical sentiment and mass murder comfortably coexist?" Cheng notes that "[compared] to whistling Nazis and musical torture, a video game's combinations of violent simulations and cheerful music present lower stakes" as video games are "supposed to be make-believe, unfolding in virtual spaces demarcated as such." Likewise, Ivănescu notes that such kinds of juxtapositions largely occur through happenstance and random chance from the radio as opposed to deliberate intent. Cheng also raises the question how long before the "juxtapositions of upbeat music and violent scenes" would come to seem "clichéd, banal, and predictable" whether by moviegoers or by players of video games like the Fallout, BioShock and the Grand Theft Auto franchises.

In 2017, singer Dion DiMucci filed a lawsuit against video game publisher ZeniMax Media for the use of "The Wanderer" in the 2015 television commercials for Fallout 4. The lawsuit alleged the commercials "were objectionable because they featured repeated homicides in a dark, dystopian landscape, where violence is glorified as sport" as well as being "repugnant and morally indefensible". DiMucci invoked a clause that he wasn't given an opportunity to reject the ads and was seeking "in excess of $1 million" in damages for the association of his song with "immoral images". In a subsequent editorial by Justin Woo, he noted that the descriptions of "repeated homicides" and the character "hunting for victims to slaughter" alleged in the lawsuit did not appear to match the official trailer which shows no images of murder or manslaughter against human beings. He notes there are other unofficial, but popular videos with "2.8 million views [using] footage from original Zenimax / Bethesda-created commercials. It has a body count so high that I'm not even going to bother enumerating it" and hypothesizes "that someone, either DiMucci or a person acting on his behalf, went to Google up 'Wanderer' and 'Fallout' and found Valenzuela's video, thinking it was an official release from Zenimax". Arbitration was compelled in 2018 in Dion DiMucci v. ZeniMax Media Inc. As of 2021 no further information about the lawsuit has come to light, but the original embedded video link to the trailer in the articles was made private and unviewable.

Notes

References

Bibliography
 
 
 
 
 
 
 
 
 
 
 
 
 
 
 
 
 

 
 

 
 

Music
Science fiction soundtracks
Video game soundtracks
Video game music discographies
Album series
Articles containing image maps